Malaysian Malays (Malay: Melayu Malaysia,) are Malaysians of Malay ethnicity whose ancestry originates wholly or partly in the Malay world. In 2015 population estimate, with the total population of 15.7 million, Malaysian Malays form 50.8% of Malaysia's demographics, the largest ethnic group in the country. They can be broadly classified into two main categories; Anak Jati (indigenous Malays or local Malays) and Anak Dagang (trading Malays or foreign Malays).

The local Malays consist of those individuals who adhere to the Malay culture native to the coastal areas of Malay peninsula and Borneo. Among notable groups include the Bruneians, Kedahans, Kelantanese, Pahangite, Perakians, Sarawakians and Terengganuans. On the other hand, the foreign Malays consist of descendants of immigrants from other parts of Malay archipelago who became the citizens of the Malay sultanates and were absorbed and assimilated into Malay culture at different times, aided by similarity in lifestyle and common religion.

Many foreign Malays or anak dagang have Acehnese, Banjarese, Buginese, Javanese, Mandailing and Minangkabau ancestries that come from Indonesia. Some foreign Malays may also come from other parts of Southeast Asia, that includes the Chams of Indochina, Cocos Malays of Australian Cocos (Keeling) Islands as well as the Patani Malays of southern Thailand. There are also a minority of Malays who are partially descended from more recent immigrants from many other countries who have assimilated into Malay Muslim culture.

Definition of a Malay

The identification of Malay with Islam traces its origin to the 15th century, when a vigorous ethos of Malay identity was developed and transmitted during the time of the Melaka Sultanate. Common definitive markers of a Malayness are thought to have been promulgated during this era, resulting in the ethnogenesis of the Malay as a major ethnoreligious group in the region. In literature, architecture, culinary traditions, traditional dress, performing arts, martial arts, and royal court traditions, Melaka set a standard that later Malay sultanates emulated. Today, the most commonly accepted elements of Malayness – the Malay Rulers,  Malay language and culture, and Islam – are institutionalised in both Malay-majority countries, Brunei and Malaysia. As a still fully functioning Malay sultanate, Brunei proclaimed Malay Islamic Monarchy as its national philosophy. In Malaysia, where the sovereignty of individual Malay sultanates and the position of Islam are preserved, a Malay identity is defined in Article 160 of the Constitution of Malaysia.

Article 160 defines a Malay as someone born to a Malaysian citizen who professes to be a Muslim, habitually speaks the Malay language, adheres to Malay customs, and is domiciled in Malaysia, Singapore or Brunei. This definition is perceived by some writers as loose enough to include people of a variety of ethnic backgrounds which basically can be defined as "Malaysian Muslims" and therefore differs from the anthropological understanding of what constitutes an ethnic Malay. However, there exist Muslim communities in Malaysia with distinctive cultures and spoken languages that cannot be categorised constitutionally as Malay. These include Muslim communities that have not fully embraced Malayness, like Tamil Muslims and Chinese Muslims.

This constitutional definition had firmly established the historical Malay ethnoreligious identity in the Malaysian legal system, where it has been suggested that a Malay cannot convert out of Islam as illustrated in the Federal Court decision in the case of Lina Joy. As of the 2010 census, Malays made up 50.1% of the population of Malaysia (including Malaysian-born or foreign-born people of Malay descent).

Genetic analyses
Studies on the genetics of modern Malays show a complex history of admixture of human populations. The analyses reveal that the Malays are genetically diverse, and that there are substantial variations between different populations of Malays. The differences may have arisen from geographical isolation and independent admixture that occurred over a long period. The studies indicate that there is no single representative genetic component, rather there are four major ancestral components to the Malay people: Austronesian, Proto-Malay, East Asian and South Asian.  The largest components of the genetic makeup of the Malays come from the Austronesian aborigines and Proto-Malays. The Austronesian component is related to the Taiwanese Ami and Atayal people, and genetic analyses of the Austronesian component in Southeast Asians may lend support to the "Out of Taiwan" hypothesis, although some suggest that it is largely indigenous with a smaller contribution from Taiwan. The Proto-Malays such as the Temuan people show genetic evidence of having moved out of Yunnan, China, thought to be about 4,000–6,000 years ago. The admixture events with South Asians (Indians) may have been ancient (estimate of up to 2,250 years ago in some Indonesian Malays), while the admixture events with East Asians (Chinese) may be more recent (100–200 years ago), although some may have occurred before the 15th century in Java. There are also minor components contributed by other groups such as the Negritos (the earliest inhabitants of the Malay Peninsula), Central Asians and Europeans. Most of the admixture events are estimated to have occurred 175 to 1,500 years ago.

Within the Malay Peninsula itself, the Malays are differentiated genetically into distinct clusters between the northern part of the Malay Peninsula and the south. SNP analyses of five of their sub-ethnic groups show that Melayu Kelantan and Melayu Kedah (both in northern Malay Peninsula) are closely related to each other as well as to Thai Patani, but are distinct from Melayu Minang (western), Melayu Jawa and Melayu Bugis (both southern). The Melayu Minang, Melayu Jawa and Melayu Bugis people show close relationship with the people of Indonesia, evidence of their shared common ancestry with these people. However, Melayu Minang are closer genetically to Melayu Kelantan and Melayu Kedah than they are to Melayu Jawa. Among the Melayu Kelantan and Melayu Kedah populations, there are significant Indian components, in particular from the Telugus and Marathis. The Melayu Kedah and Melayu Kelantan also have closer genetic relationship to the two subgroups of the Orang Asli Semang, Jahai and Kensiu, than other Malay groups. Four of the Malay sub-ethnic groups in this study (the exception being Melayu Bugis, who are related to the people of Sulawesi) also show genetic similarity to the Proto-Malay Temuan people with possible admixture to the Jawa populations and the Wa people of Yunnan, China.

History 

The Malay World, home of the various Malayic Austronesian tribes since the last Ice age (circa 15,000–10,000 BCE), exhibits fascinating ethnic, linguistic and cultural variations. The indigenous animistic belief system, which employed the concept of semangat (spirit) in every natural objects, was predominant among the ancient Malayic tribes before the arrival of Dharmic religions. Deep in the estuary of the Merbok River, lies an abundance of historical relics that have unmasked several ceremonial and religious architectures devoted for the sun and mountain worshiping. At its zenith, the massive settlement sprawled across a thousand kilometers wide, dominated in the northern plains of the Malay Peninsula. On contemporary account, the area is known as the lost city of Sungai Batu. Founded in 535 BC, it is the oldest testament of civilisation in Southeast Asia and a potential progenitor of the Kedah Tua kingdom. In addition to Sungai Batu, the coastal areas of the Malay peninsula also witnessed the development of other subsequent ancient urban settlements and regional polities, driven by a predominantly cosmopolitan agrarian society, thriving skilled craftsmanship, multinational merchants and foreign expatriates. Chinese records noted the names of Akola, P’an P’an, Tun-Sun, Chieh-ch'a, Ch'ih-tu, Pohuang, Lang-ya-xiu among few. Upon the fifth century AD, these settlements had morphed into a sovereign city-states, collectively fashioned by an active participation in the international trade network and hosting diplomatic embassies from China and India. Between the 7th and 13th centuries, many of these small, prosperous peninsula maritime trading states, became part of the mandala of Srivijaya,

The Islamic faith arrived on the shores of Malay peninsula from around the 12th century. The earliest archaeological evidence of Islam is the Terengganu Inscription Stone dating from the 14th century. By the 15th century, the Melaka Sultanate, whose hegemony reached over much of the western Malay Archipelago, had become the centre of Islamisation in the east. Islamisation developed an ethnoreligious identity in Melaka with the term 'Melayu' then, begins to appear as interchangeable with Melakans, especially in describing the cultural preferences of the Melakans as against the foreigners. It is generally believed that Malayisation intensified within Strait of Malacca region following the territorial and commercial expansion of the sultanate in the mid 15th century. In 1511, the Melakan capital fell into the hands of Portuguese conquistadors. However, the sultanate remained an institutional prototype: a paradigm of statecraft and a point of cultural reference for successor states like Johor, Perak and Pahang. In the same era, the sultanates of Kedah, Kelantan and Patani dominated the northern part of the Malay peninsula. Across the South China Sea, the Bruneian Empire became the most powerful polity in Borneo and reached its golden age in the mid-16th century when it controlled land as far south as present day Kuching in Sarawak, north towards the Philippine Archipelago. By the 18th century, Minangkabau and Bugis settlers established the chiefdom of Negeri Sembilan and the sultanate of Selangor respectively.

Historically, Malay states of the peninsular had a hostile relation with the Siamese. Melaka herself fought two wars with the Siamese while northern Malay states came intermittently under Siamese dominance for centuries. From 1771, the Kingdom of Siam under the Chakri dynasty annexed both Patani and Kedah. Between 1808 and 1813, the Siamese partitioned Patani into smaller states while carving out Setul, Langu, Kubang Pasu and Perlis from Kedah in 1839. In 1786, the island of Penang was leased to East India Company by Kedah in exchange of military assistance against the Siamese. In 1819, the company also acquired Singapore from Johor Empire, later in 1824, Dutch Malacca from the Dutch, and followed by Dindings from Perak by 1874. All these trading posts officially known as Straits Settlements in 1826 and became the crown colony of British Empire in 1867. British intervention in the affairs of Malay states was formalised in 1895, when Malay rulers of Pahang, Selangor, Perak and Negeri Sembilan accepted British Residents and formed the Federated Malay States. In 1909, Kedah, Kelantan, Terengganu and Perlis were handed over by Siam to the British. These states along with Johor, later became known as Unfederated Malay States. During the World War II, all these British possessions and protectorates that collectively known as British Malaya were occupied by the Empire of Japan.

Malay nationalism, which developed in the early 1900s, had a cultural rather than a political character. The discussions on a 'Malay nation' focussed on questions of identity and distinction in terms of customs, religion, and language, rather than politics. The debate surrounding the transition centred on the question of who could be called the real Malay, and the friction led to the emergence of various factions amongst Malay nationalists. The leftists from Kesatuan Melayu Muda were among the earliest who appeared with an ideal of a Republic of Greater Indonesia for a Pan-Malay identity. The version of Malayness brought by this group was largely modelled on the orientalist's concept of Malay race, that transcend the religious boundary and with the absent of the role of monarchy. Another attempt to redefine the Malayness was made by a coalition of left wing political parties, the AMCJA, that proposed the term 'Melayu' as a demonym or citizenship for an independent Malaya. In the wake of the armed rebellion launched by the Malayan Communist Party, the activities of most left wing organizations came to a halt following the declaration of Malayan Emergency in 1948 that witnessed a major purges by the British colonial government. This development left those of moderate and traditionalist faction, with an opportunity to gain their ground in the struggle for Malaya's independence. The conservatives led by United Malays National Organization, that vehemently promoted Malay language, Islam and Malay monarchy as key pillars of Malayness, emerged with popular support not only from general Malay population, but also from the Rulers of the Conference of Rulers. Mass protests from this group against the Malayan Union, a unitary state project, forced the British to accept an alternative federalist order known as the Federation of Malaya. The federation would later be reconstituted as Malaysia in 1963.

Language 

Malay is the national language, and the most commonly spoken language in Malaysia, where it is estimated that 20 percent of all native speakers of Malay live. The terminology as per federal government policy is Bahasa Malaysia (literally "Malaysian language") but in the federal constitution continues to refer to the official language as Bahasa Melayu (literally "Malay language"). The National Language Act 1967 specifies the Latin (Rumi) script as the official script of the national language, but allow the use of the traditional Jawi script. Jawi is still used in the official documents of state Islamic religious departments and councils, on road and building signs, and also taught in primary and religious schools.

Malay is also spoken Brunei, Indonesia, Singapore, Timor Leste as well as  Thailand and Australian Cocos and Christmas Islands. The total number of speakers of Standard Malay is about 60 million. There are also about 198 million people who speak Indonesian, which is a form of Malay. Standard Malay differs from Indonesian in a number of ways, the most striking being in terms of vocabulary, pronunciation and spelling. Less obvious differences are present in grammar. The differences are rarely a barrier to effective communication between Indonesian and Malay speakers, but there are certainly enough differences to cause occasional misunderstandings, usually surrounding slang or dialect differences.

The Malay language came into widespread use as the lingua franca of the Melaka sultanate (1402–1511). During this period, the language developed rapidly under the influence of Islamic literature. The development changed the nature of the language with massive infusion of Arabic and Sanskrit vocabularies, called Classical Malay. Under Melaka, the language evolved into a form recognisable to speakers of modern Malay. When the court moved to establish the Johor Sultanate, it continued using the classical language; it has become so associated with Dutch Riau and British Johor that it is often assumed that the Malay of Riau is close to the classical language. However, there is no connection between Melakan Malay as used on Riau and the Riau vernacular.

Variants of Malay in Malaysia differed by states, districts or even villages. The Melaka-Johor dialect, owing to its prominence in the past, became the standard speech among Malays in Brunei, Malaysia and Singapore and it formed the original basis for the standardised Indonesian language. There are also well-known variants of Malayan languages that are mostly unintelligible to Standard Malay speakers including Kelantanese, Terengganuan, Pahangite, Kedahan (including Perlisian and Penangite), Perakian, Negeri Sembilanese, Sarawakian, and Bruneian (including a Bruneian-based pidgin Sabah Malay).

Culture 

In Malaysia, the state's constitution empowered Malay rulers as the head of Islam and Malay customs in their respective state. State councils known as Majlis Agama Islam dan Adat Istiadat Melayu (Council of Islam and Malay Customs) are responsible in advising the rulers as well as regulating both Islamic affairs and Malay adat. Legal proceedings on matters related to Islamic affairs and Malay adat are carried out in Syariah Court. There is considerable genetic, linguistic, cultural, and social diversity among the many Malay subgroups as a result of hundreds of years of immigration and assimilation of various regional ethnicity and tribes within Southeast Asia.

Malay cultures trace their origin from the early settlers that consist primarily from both various Malayic speaking Austronesians and various Austroasiatic tribes. Around the opening of the common era, Dharmic religions were introduced to the region, where it flourished with the establishment of many ancient maritime trading states in the coastal areas of Malay peninsula and Borneo. Much of the cultural identities originating from these ancient states survived among the east coasters (Kelantanese, Terengganuans, Pahangites), northerners (Kedahans and Perakians), and Bornean (Bruneians and Sarawakians).

The traditional culture of Malaysian Malays is largely predominated by the indigenous Malay culture mixed with a variety of foreign influences. As opposed to other regional Malays, the southern Malays (Selangoreans, Negeri Sembilanese, Melakans and Johoreans) display the cultural legacy of the Melaka sultanate. Common definitive markers of Malayness – the religion of Islam, Malay language and Malay adat – are thought to have been promulgated in the region. This region also shows the influences of other parts of the Malay archipelago due to mass migration during the 17th century. Among the earliest groups were the Minangkabau who had established themselves in Negeri Sembilan, Buginese who had formed the Selangor sultanate and domiciled in large numbers in Johor.

The development of many Malay Muslim-dominated centres in the region drew many of the non-Malay indigenous people like the Dayak, Orang Asli and Orang laut, to embrace Malayness by converting to Islam, emulating the Malay speech and their dress. Throughout their history, the Malays have been known as a coastal-trading community with fluid cultural characteristics. They absorbed, shared and transmitted numerous cultural features of other foreign ethnic groups. The cultural fusion between local Malay culture and other foreign cultures also led to the ethnocultural development of the related Arab Peranakan, Baba Nyonya, Chetti Melaka, Jawi Pekan, Kristang, Sam-sam and Punjabi Peranakan cultures.

Today, some Malays have recent forebears from other parts of maritime Southeast Asia, termed as anak dagang ("traders") or foreign Malays who have assimilated into the Malay culture. Other significant population of foreign Malays also includes Acehnese in Kedah, Banjarese and Mandailing in Perak,  Chams and Patani Malays in Kelantan and Terengganu as well as Cocos Malays in Sabah. Between the 19th century and the early 20th century, a significant number of immigrants from Java and Sumatra came as traders, settlers and indenture labours to Malaya. British census from 1911 to 1931 shows that many of the immigrants concentrated on the west coast of Malay peninsula and largely predominated by ethnic Javanese. The process of adaptation and assimilation carried out by these ethnicities later gave birth to new Malay communities that retain a close relationship with their cultural roots in Java and Sumatra until today.

In 1971, the government created a "National Culture Policy", defining Malaysian culture. The three principles of the National Culture Policy are; Malaysian culture must be based on the indigenous culture of the region, that is the Malay culture, secondly it may incorporate suitable elements from other cultures, and lastly that Islam must play a part in it. Much of Malaysian culture shows heavy influences from Malay culture, an example can be seen in the belief system, whereby the practice of Keramat shrine worshipping that prevalent among Malaysian Chinese, originates from the Malay culture. Other Malay cultural influence can also be seen in traditional dress, cuisine, literature, music, arts and architecture. Traditional Malay dress varies between different regions but the most popular dress in modern-day are Baju Kurung and Baju Kebaya (for women) and Baju Melayu (for men), which all recognised as the national dress of Malaysia.

Many other Malay cultural heritage, are considered as Malaysian national heritage including Mak Yong, Dondang Sayang, Silat, Pantun, Songket, Mek Mulung, Kris, Wayang Kulit, Batik, Pinas and Gamelan. The classical Malay literature tradition that flourished since the 15th century and various genres of Malay folklore also forms the basis of the modern Malaysian literature and folklore. The Malaysian music scene also witnessed strong influence from the Malay traditional music. One particularly important was the emergence of Irama Malaysia ('Malaysian beat'), a type of Malaysian pop music that combined Malay social dance and syncretic music such as Asli, Inang, Joget, Zapin, Ghazal, Bongai, Dikir Barat, Boria, Keroncong and Rodat.

Demographics

Malaysia 
Malays are the majority of the ethnic groups in Malaysia. Every state has a population of Malays ranging from around 40% to over 90%, except for Sabah and Sarawak which are the only states where Malays are less than 30%. Figures given below are from the 2010 census, and 2015 numbers. The population figures are also given as percentages of the total state population that includes non-citizens.

Diaspora 
There is a community of Malaysian Malays who make up 20% of the total population of the Australian external territory of Christmas Island.

Anak Dagang subgroups
Other than Anak Jati, Anak Dagang are descended from different ethnic groups that are found throughout the Malay World such Javanese, Boyanese, Bugis, Minangkabaus, Banjarese and the Acehnese.

Cocos Malays 
The Cocos Malays in Malaysia primarily reside in several villages known as Kampung Cocos in the towns of Lahad Datu and Tawau, both located in Tawau Division of Sabah state. Originally from the Cocos Islands, they settled on this area in the 1950s after being brought by the British. The number of those who participated in the first emigration is thought to be around twenty, but it increased when they expanded their settlement in Lahad Datu. Their culture is closely related to the Malay peoples in Malaysia and their current population in Sabah is around 4,000, about eight times larger than the population remaining in the Cocos Islands. They are accorded bumiputra status by the Malaysian government and also a part of the Malaysian Malays ethnic group found in the state of Sabah.

Chams 
After the fall of Saigon in Vietnam and Phnom Penh in Cambodia in 1975, 9,704 Cham refugees made their way to Malaysia and were allowed to stay, unlike 250,000 other refugees that fled to Malaysia. Most of the Cham refugees came from Cambodia and were Muslims, known as Melayu Kemboja and Melayu Champa in Malay. Many of these Cham refugees chose to settle in Malaysia, as they preferred to live in an Islamic country and had family ties in the Malaysian states of Kelantan and Terengganu. Kelantan served as a center of Islamic teachings for Chams in Cambodia for three to four centuries and many Cambodian Chams had relatives living there, subsequently many Chams chose to settle in Kelantan. By 1985, around 50,000 or more Chams were living in Malaysia. As of 2013, many have been integrated into Malaysian society.

Javanese

The Javanese Malaysians are people of full or partial Javanese descent who were born in or immigrated to Malaysia. They form a significant part of Malaysia's population and Malaysian law considers most of them to be Malays. They come from Java, Malaysia is home to the largest Javanese population outside Indonesia. Many important and well-known figures in Malaysia are of Javanese descent. Javanese migration to Malaysia had occurred before the colonial era. The first wave of Javanese people came during the Sultanate of Malacca era in the 15th century. Political marriages between kingdoms, such as between Sultan Mansur Shah of Malacca sultanate and Princess Raden Galuh Chandra Kirana of Majapahit, were an evidence that the interaction between nations has started a long time ago. This story is told in the 16th century ancient Malay manuscript, Sulalatus Salatin. The Javanese in Malaysia have adapted to the local culture and social values very well. The Javanese in Malaysia have adopted Malay culture, they speak Malay and use Malay names.

The presence of the Javanese in Malaysia has become part of the history and contribution to the development of the state of Malaysia. Many political figures have held important positions in the Malaysian government, including Ahmad Zahid Hamidi, previous Deputy Prime Minister of Malaysia, and Muhyiddin Yassin, who served as the 8th Prime Minister of Malaysia. There are also many Malaysian artists of Javanese descent, such as Mohammad Azwan bin Mohammad Nr or better known as Wak Doyok, a businessman and fashion icon and also Herman Tino, the pioneer of dangdut singers in Malaysia.

Most Malaysians of Javanese descent have assimilated into the local Malay culture, and speak Malay as a native tongue and first language rather than the Javanese language of their ancestors. This occurs through usual assimilation, as well as intermarriages with other ethnic groups. This qualifies them as Malays under Malaysian law. The situation is identical with the Javanese in Singapore, where they are considered Malay.

Minangkabau

The Minangkabau Malaysians are people of full or partial Minangkabau descent who were born in or immigrated to Malaysia. They form a significant part of Malaysia's population and Malaysian law considers most of them to be Malays. The Minangkabau people originate from West Sumatra, have a long history of migration to Malaysia. Minangkabau people are dominant in Negeri Sembilan, both in terms of population, politics, and culture. At the beginning of the 14th century, the Minangkabau people arrived in Negeri Sembilan via Melaka and initially settled in Rembau. The Minangkabau people who arrived at that time had a more advanced civilisation than the Orang Asli (a term used to describe the indigenous people in the are) in Negeri Sembilan. From the marriage between the Minangkabau people and the Orang Asli, the Biduanda clan was born. It is from the Biduanda clan that the chieftains of Negeri Sembilan (the 'Penghulu' and 'Undang') descend. The initial migration of the Minangkabau people mostly came from the Tanah Datar and Payakumbuh areas of West Sumatra.

Before the establishment of the Yang di-Pertuan Besar post and the royal institution, Negeri Sembilan was under the protection of the Malacca Sultanate and then the Johor Sultanate. In the 18th century the weakened Johor was no longer able to protect Negeri Sembilan from Bugis attacks. Therefore, the leaders of Negeri Sembilan requested that they be allowed to invite a prince from Pagaruyung (West Sumatra) to rule over them. The then King of Pagaruyung, Sultan Abdul Jalil, granted the request and sent Raja Melewar to become King, or Yamtuan Besar in Seri Menanti.

The Negeri Sembilan people follow the Adat Perpatih customs and traditions, which involves inheritance based on matrilineal lineage; clan lineage is also determined by matrilineal descent.

The population census in Malaysia does not categorise Minangkabau as a separate ethnic group, but is generally classified as Malay. However, based on estimates, there are around 989,000 Minangkabau people living in Malaysia. Although accounting for less than 5% of Malaysia's population, their presence has contributed significantly to the development of this country. Before independence, there were many Minangkabau people in Malaysia who took part and held significant influence. They were mostly traders, clerics, and politicians. Long before the arrival of the British to Penang, there were already many Minang businessmen who traded on the island. Datuk Jannaton, Nakhoda Intan, dan Nakhoda Kecil are some of the cross-strait entrepreneurs based in Penang. In the 19th century, Muhammad Saleh Al-Minankabawi became the mufti of the Perak Kingdom and Uthman bin Abdullah became the first qadi in Kuala Lumpur. In addition, Mohamed Taib bin Haji Abdul Samad, who has a fairly large business, became an explorer in the Chow Kit area in Kuala Lumpur. In the mid-20th century, many Minangkabau figures became politicians at the same time. Some of them are Abdullah C.D., Ahmad Boestamam, Burhanuddin al-Hilmi, Shamsiah Fakeh, and Mokhtaruddin Lasso.

After independence, many important Malaysian figures and public figures were of Minangkabau descent. These include Sheikh Muszaphar Shukor, Malaysia's first spaceman, Rais Yatim, one of Malaysia's longest serving government minister, U-Wei bin Haji Saari, one of Malaysia's acclaimed directors, entrepreneur Kamarudin Meranun, and Saiful Bahri, the composer of Malaysia's national anthem, "Negaraku".

Bugis
The Bugis Malaysians are people of full or partial Bugis descent who were born in or immigrated to Malaysia. They form a significant part of Malaysia's population and Malaysian law considers most of them to be Malays. The Bugis people originate from South Sulawesi and have played an important role in Malaysian history. The Bugis at that time were directly involved in the politics of the Malay kingdoms. The conclusion in 1669 of a protracted civil war led to a diaspora of Bugis and their entry into the politics of the Sumatra and Malay Peninsula. The Bugis played an important role in defeating Jambi and had a huge influence in Sultanate of Johor. Apart from the Malays, another influential faction in Johor at that time was the Minangkabau. Both the Buginese and the Minangkabau aware how the death of Sultan Mahmud II had provided them with the chance to exert major influence in Johor.

It started when King Sulaiman Badrul Alam Shah wanted to control Johor and Riau lingga which was controlled by Sultan Abdul Jalil Rahmat Shah or known as	Raja Kecil. Then with the help of the Bugis from Klang, King Sulaiman managed to seize the territory of Johor and Riau Lingga from the hands of Raja Kecil. In return, King Sulaiman gave the title of Yang Dipertuan Muda to Daeng Marewah who ruled in Johor and Riau Lingga. Until now the kings in the Sultanate of Johor and the Sultanate of Selangor are of Bugis descent. The population census in Malaysia also does not categorize the Bugis as a separate ethnic group, but rather as a Malay ethnic group. The presence of the Bugis in Malaysia has become a part of history and a contribution to the development of the State of Malaysia. Several Prime Ministers in Malaysia are of Bugis descent, include Tun Abdul Razak and his son Najib Razak. There are also many Malaysian public figures who have Bugis ancestry such as the famous Malaysian singer, Yuna.

In modern Malaysia, Buginese are classified as Bumiputera (like members of other historical immigrant ethnicities originating from Indonesia).

Banjar
The Banjar Malaysians are people of full or partial Banjar descent who were born in or immigrated to Malaysia. They form a significant part of Malaysia's population and Malaysian law considers most of them to be Malays. In contrast to the Malay Peninsula, in Sabah the Banjarese are considered a separate ethnic group from the Malays. In Malaysia, many Banjarese are still fluent in Banjarese and have culinary and cultural characteristics similar to their native South Kalimantan. Banjar communities in Malaysia can be found almost all over the country.

The Banjar people have emigrated to the Malay Peninsula hundreds of years ago. The first generation of Banjar people initially cultivated agricultural land. Many of them live in the Bagan Serai and Sungai Manik areas. Following World War II, the Banjarese contributed to the expulsion of communists in Malaysia.

Bawean
The Bawean Malaysians are people of full or partial Bawean descent who were born in or immigrated to Malaysia. The Bawean ethnicity in Malaysia is not as much as the Minang, Javanese, and Bugis ethnicities. Even so they are also categorized as Malays. The Bawean or Boyanese people come from Bawean Island, off the north coast of Java. In Malaysia, the Bawean people are better known as the Boyan people or Babian people. The word Boyan actually means driver or gardener, because at the beginning of the migration, many Baweans in Malaysia worked as drivers or gardeners. The lack of documentation and historical records has resulted in the exact time when the Baweans arrived in Malaysia. There are various theories regarding the arrival of the Baweans in the Malay Peninsula. There is an opinion that there was a Bawean named Tok Ayar who arrived in Melaka in 1819. In Melaka, the Baweans also spread to the Klang Valley, such as in the Ampang, Gombak, Balakong and Shah Alam areas. The population census in Malaysia does not categorize the Bawaean or Boyan people as a separate ethnic group but is classified as a Malay ethnicity. The presence of the Bawean people in Malaysia has become a part of history and a contribution to the development of the State of Malaysia.

Acehnese
The Acehnese Malaysians are people of full or partial Acehnese descent who were born in or immigrated to Malaysia. They form a significant part of Malaysia's population and Malaysian law considers most of them to be Malays. They come from Aceh, northern tip of Sumatra. The existence of the Acehnese in Malaysia has existed for hundreds of years. Aceh's relations with countries in Peninsular Malaysia have existed since the 16th century. The Acehnese, especially in Penang, have contributed a lot to economic growth through the export of their natural wealth, especially pepper. During the war against the Dutch, Aceh made Penang a place for international lobbying, to thwart Aceh from Dutch colonialism. The Lebuh Aceh Mosque is the oldest mosque in Penang. Currently, it is estimated that there are hundreds of thousands of people of Acehnese descent in Malaysia. Many Acehnese in Malaysia have played important and influential roles in Malaysia such as songwriter and singer P. Ramlee and former Minister Sanusi Junid.

Notable people

See also

 Malay Indonesian
 Sama-Bajau
 Tausūg people
 Dayak people
 Bruneian Malay people

References

Bibliography
 
 

 
 
 
 
 
 
 
 
 
 
 
 
 
 
 
 
 
 
 
 
 
 
 

Ethnoreligious groups in Asia
 
Malay
Malay people